Bed Stories is an Indian Hindi-language romantic anthology streaming television series produced by Sooraj Khanna and Puneet Shukla. Written and directed by Arpita Pattanayak. It stars Sanjay Mishra, Rajendra Gupta, Indira Tiwari, Aparajita Dey, Natasha Rashtogi, Saharsh Kumar Shukla, Taneea Rajawat with an ensemble cast of actors. All seven episodes released on Disney+ Hotstar on 7 July 2022.

Cast
Sanjay Mishra as The Bed
Rajendra Gupta as Ramdas
Indira Tiwari as Jaweda
Saharsh Kumar Shukla as Avtar
Taneea Rajawat as Rama
Paritosh Tripathi as Dayavaan
Priyanshu Singh as Aditya
Gazal Sood as Karishma
Natasha Rashtogi as Sushma
Chetan Sharma as Shahid
Vikas Shukla as Ayub
Prageet Pandit as Karan
Aparajita Dey as Rani
Altaf Khan 
Jiya Solanki as Rinki
Harveer Singh
Junaid Khan
Tripurari Yadav
Samridhi Chandola

References

External links
 
Bed Stories on Disney+ Hotstar

Hindi-language Disney+ Hotstar original programming
2022 Indian television series debuts